The Campeonato de la Victoria or Torneo de la Victoria is Paraguay's most important national athletics competition, disputed annually since 1950. The Federación Paraguaya de Atletismo's calendar consists of several national evaluative athletics competitions disputed throughout the year and culminates with the Championship of the Victoria.

The competition is contested by athletes registered with clubs affiliated with the Federación Paraguaya de Atletismo. All competitions under the Federación Paraguaya de Atletismo take place at the Secretaria Nacional de Deportes, located in the city of Asunción.

The 2016 edition was disputed at the Olympic Stadium based at the Paraguayan Olympic Committee in the city of Luque.

History
The FPA's Campeonato de la Victoria or Torneo de la Victoria is the most important national athletics competition and occurs towards the end of the calendar year. The championship forms part of the history of Paraguayan Athletics. The competition has been active since 1950.

List of championships

See also
 Sport in Paraguay
 Paraguayan Olympic Committee
 Paraguayan Athletics Federation
 Paraguayan records in athletics
 List of athletics clubs in Paraguay

References

External links
 Federación Paraguaya de Atletismo

 
Athletics competitions in Paraguay
National athletics competitions
Athletics